Olszewo may refer to the following places:
Olszewo, Gmina Boćki in Podlaskie Voivodeship (north-east Poland)
Olszewo, Gmina Brańsk in Podlaskie Voivodeship (north-east Poland)
Olszewo, Łomża County in Podlaskie Voivodeship (north-east Poland)
Olszewo, Siemiatycze County in Podlaskie Voivodeship (north-east Poland)
Olszewo, Łódź Voivodeship (central Poland)
Olszewo, Masovian Voivodeship (east-central Poland)
Olszewo, Konin County in Greater Poland Voivodeship (west-central Poland)
Olszewo, Kościan County in Greater Poland Voivodeship (west-central Poland)
Olszewo, Środa Wielkopolska County in Greater Poland Voivodeship (west-central Poland)
Olszewo, Działdowo County in Warmian-Masurian Voivodeship (north Poland)
Olszewo, Gmina Prostki in Warmian-Masurian Voivodeship (north Poland)
Olszewo, Gmina Stare Juchy in Warmian-Masurian Voivodeship (north Poland)
Olszewo, Mrągowo County in Warmian-Masurian Voivodeship (north Poland)
Olszewo, Nidzica County in Warmian-Masurian Voivodeship (north Poland)
Olszewo, Olecko County in Warmian-Masurian Voivodeship (north Poland)